is a Shinto shrine in Shimabara, Nagasaki Prefecture, Japan. It enshrines the first Shōgun of the Tokugawa Shogunate, Tokugawa Ieyasu.

See also 
Tōshō-gū
List of Tōshō-gū

Shinto shrines in Nagasaki Prefecture
Tōshō-gū